Warren Cleage Evans (born December 30, 1948) is an American law enforcement official, lawyer, and politician serving as the county executive of Wayne County, Michigan since 2015. A member of the Democratic Party, Evans previously served as the chief of the Detroit Police Department from 2009 to 2010, and as the Wayne County Sheriff from 2003 to 2009.

Early career
Evans began his career in law enforcement as a deputy with the Wayne County Sheriff's Department in 1970. Evans rose through the ranks of the department, serving as Undersheriff, the department's second-in-command officer from 1987 through 1991. Evans became the director of administration for the Wayne County Board of Commissioners in 1991 and created the Wayne County Department of Community Justice and served as its director from 1992 to 1997. He rejoined county government in 2001 as chief of Special Operations for the Wayne County Prosecutor's Office in 2001 and was named sheriff in 2003 and was elected to full terms in 2004 and 2008.

Chief of Police
On July 6, 2009, Evans was named as the 39th Chief of Police of the Detroit Police Department by Mayor Dave Bing, replacing James Barren, who Bing had fired the previous Friday.

Evans was asked to resign by Bing just over a year into his tenure in July 2010. Bing did not give specifics why he asked Evans to resign but said "a combination of things" were met with disapproval, and the department was "compromised in some of the decisions he made." Speculation over Evans' desire to be a reality TV star and a relationship he had with a subordinate in the department contributed to his removal.

Politics
Evans ran for mayor of Detroit in the February 2009 special election caused by the resignation of Kwame Kilpatrick in September 2008. Evans came in fourth in the primary, taking just over 10 percent of the vote, Bing and then-interim Mayor Ken Cockrel, Jr. advanced to the general special election in May.

Evans announced in April 2014 that he was going to seek the Democratic nomination for Wayne County Executive, challenging 3-term incumbent Robert Ficano. Evans easily won the Democratic primary in August 2014, taking 46 percent of the vote in a ten-person field. Evans defeated Republican nominee John Dalton in the general election.

After running unopposed in the Democratic Primary, Evans defeated Republican challenger Denis Curran to win a second-term as County Executive in November 2018.

In the 2020 United States presidential election, Evans publicly endorsed Democratic candidate Michael Bloomberg after his campaign hired Evans' wife.

Electoral history

References

Living people
1948 births
County executives in Michigan
Politicians from Detroit
Madonna University alumni
University of Detroit Mercy alumni
Detroit College of Law alumni
Michigan Democrats
Sheriffs of Wayne County, Michigan
Detroit Police Department chiefs
21st-century American politicians